Andrew Granville Pierce (August 9, 1829 - September 11, 1903) was an American businessman and politician who served as Mayor of New Bedford, Massachusetts.

Pierce was born in New Bedford, Massachusetts on August 9, 1829.

Pierce married Caroline Lincoln Hillman on July 17, 1854.

Pierce died on September 11, 1903.

Notes

Mayors of New Bedford, Massachusetts
1829 births
1903 deaths
Massachusetts city council members
Massachusetts Republicans
19th-century American politicians